Henry Converse Atwill (1872–1936) was an American politician who served as Massachusetts Attorney General from 1915 to 1919. He was born in Lynn in 1872.

Atwill served in the Massachusetts House of Representatives from 1896 to 1898 and the Massachusetts Senate from 1899 to 1901. From 1905 to 1910 he was an Assistant District Attorney in Essex County, Massachusetts. When District Attorney W. Scott Peters retired, Atwill was elected to succeed him. As Essex County DA, Atwill oversaw the prosecution of Joseph James Ettor, Arturo Giovannitti, and Joseph Caruso for the murder of Anna Lopizzo during the 1912 Lawrence Textile Strike.

Atwill was elected Attorney General in 1914. He resigned in 1919 and Henry A. Wyman completed his term. He died November 1, 1936.

References

1872 births
1936 deaths
Boston University School of Law alumni
Massachusetts Attorneys General
Republican Party members of the Massachusetts House of Representatives
Republican Party Massachusetts state senators
Politicians from Lynn, Massachusetts
Massachusetts lawyers
20th-century American politicians